Monodilepas skinneri is a species of small sea snail, a keyhole limpet, a marine gastropod mollusc in the family Fissurellidae, the keyhole limpets and slit limpets. This species is endemic to the Chatham Islands, New Zealand.

References

 Powell A. W. B., William Collins Publishers Ltd, Auckland 1979 

Fissurellidae
Gastropods of New Zealand
Gastropods described in 1928
Taxa named by Harold John Finlay